The  Basilica of the Sacred Heart of Jesus, also known as Conewago Chapel,  is a Roman Catholic minor basilica dedicated to the Sacred Heart of Jesus located in Conewago Township (Adams County), Pennsylvania.  The church is a part of the Roman Catholic Diocese of Harrisburg.

Description
The Basilica was built between 1785 and 1787, and is constructed of brownstone with three-foot-thick walls. It measures  stories high, three bays wide and five bays deep.  It features a Federal style entrance with a semi-circular arched doorway and an 80-foot-high spire, added in 1873. Attached to the chapel is a three-story rectory, also built in 1787.  It is the oldest Roman Catholic church constructed of stone in the United States. Prince Gallitzin spent the first five years of his priesthood at Conewago Chapel from 1795 to 1799.

It was decreed a minor basilica on June 30, 1962.  It was listed on the National Register of Historic Places in 1975.

List of Pastors 
The following priests have served as pastor of the church:

See also

 John W. Beschter

References

External links

Basilica of the Sacred Heart of Jesus information
Basilica of the Sacred Heart of Jesus organ specifications from the American Guild of Organists

Churches on the National Register of Historic Places in Pennsylvania
Federal architecture in Pennsylvania
Roman Catholic churches completed in 1787
Sacred Heart of Jesus
Sacred Heart of Jesus
Churches in Adams County, Pennsylvania
Roman Catholic Diocese of Harrisburg
1787 establishments in Pennsylvania
18th-century Roman Catholic church buildings in the United States
National Register of Historic Places in Adams County, Pennsylvania